Nadeau is an unincorporated community in Menominee County, Michigan, United States. Nadeau has a post office with ZIP code 49863.

History 
Nadeau was settled as a farm owned by Barney Nadeau. In 1878, the Chicago and North Western Railway opened a station in the community. A post office opened in Nadeau under the name Nadean, with Barney Nadeau serving as postmaster; the name was corrected to Nadeau on February 20, 1890.

Images

References

Unincorporated communities in Menominee County, Michigan
Unincorporated communities in Michigan